Ranieri de' Calzabigi (23 December 1714 – July 1795) was an Italian poet and librettist, most famous for his collaboration with the composer Christoph Willibald Gluck on his "reform" operas.

Born in Livorno, Calzabigi spent the 1750s in Paris, where he became a close friend of Giacomo Casanova. Here he explored his interest in opera, producing an edition of the works of Pietro Metastasio, the most famous librettist of opera seria. However, Calzabigi was also impressed by French tragédie en musique, and eager to reform Italian opera by making it simpler and more dramatically effective. In 1761 he settled in Vienna, where he met likeminded reformers: Gluck; Count Giacomo Durazzo, the theatre director; Gasparo Angiolini, the choreographer; Giovanni Maria Quaglio, the set designer; and the castrato Gaetano Guadagni. Together they worked on Gluck's groundbreaking Orfeo ed Euridice in 1762. Calzabigi then wrote the libretto for Alceste, which further abandoned the practices of opera seria in favour of "noble simplicity". In the preface to this work, to which Gluck put his signature, Calzabigi set out his manifesto for reforming opera. A third collaboration, Paride ed Elena, followed in 1770. Calzabigi also contributed to the scenario of Gluck's reformist ballet, Don Juan, in 1761. 

La finta giardiniera, set by Pasquale Anfossi in 1774 and Wolfgang Amadeus Mozart in 1775, has been ascribed to Calzabigi, but this is now regarded as doubtful.

In 1774 Calzabigi was banished from the Viennese court as the result of a scandal and took up residence in Pisa and in 1780 in Naples, where he wrote his last two librettos, Elfrida (1792) and Elvira (1794), both set to music by Giovanni Paisiello, and continued his literary activities until his death.

Legacy 

German composer Georgina Schubert (1840-1878) used Calzabigi’s text for her lieder “Romanza.”

Notes

External links
 Alceste: opera with libretto by Calzabigi and music by Gluck, vocal score from Sibley Music Library Digital Scores Collection
 Daniel Winkler: "Körper und Tragödie. Alfieris und Calzabigis paratextueller Kampf um eine reine Gattung", in: Körper, Revolution, Nation. – Vittorio Alfieri und das republikanische Tragödienprojekt der Sattelzeit., Wilhelm Fink, Munich 2016, . 49–104. pp. 153–190.

1714 births
1795 deaths
People from Livorno
Ballet librettists
Italian expatriates in Austria
Italian opera librettists
Italian male dramatists and playwrights
18th-century Italian dramatists and playwrights
18th-century Italian male writers